Olea borneensis  is a plant of the genus Olea. The bark is whitish or light grey. The flowers are white or yellowish-green. Fruit ripens to black. Habitat is forests from sea level to  altitude. O. borneensis is found in Borneo and the Philippines.

References

External links

borneensis
Plants described in 1899
Trees of Borneo
Trees of the Philippines
Lamiales of Asia